New Sinhala Heritage is a Sri Lankan political party founded in 2006 by former United National Party member Sarath Manamendra. The party became a member of the UNP-led United National Front in November 2009.

In the January 2010 presidential election party leader Manamendra stood as the party's candidate getting 0.09% of votes. The party contested the April 2010 general election as a part of the Democratic National Alliance led by General Sarath Fonseka. New Sinhala Heritage got no seats. It was expelled from the DNA in November 2010.

References

Political parties in Sri Lanka
United National Front (Sri Lanka)
2006 establishments in Sri Lanka
Political parties established in 2006